Tsuioku+Love Letter is Japanese singer Hitomi Shimatani's fourth studio album. Released on September 1, 2004, it hit No. 7 on the Oricon charts and went on to sell around 107,000 copies.

Track listing
 追憶+Love Letter (Tsuioku, Reminiscence)
 Angelus/Z! Z! Z! (Zip! Zap! Zipangu!) (Anjerasu)
 「またね。」 (Mata ne., See You)
 久遠: kuon (Kuon, Eternity)
 Z! Z! Z!: Zip! Zap! Zipangu!
 Domenica
 Jewel of Kiss
 はつこい (Hatsukoi, First Love)
 Viola
 ハナムケノ言葉 (Hanamuke no Kotoba, Parting Words)
 Yume 日和 (Album Version) (Yume Biyori, Weather of Our Dreams)
 綺羅星 (Kiraboshi, Shining Star)
 手のひらを太陽に (Bonus Track) (Tenohira wo Taiyou ni, The Sun Through My Palms)

Hitomi Shimatani albums
2004 albums